The Nepal Peace Pagoda in Brisbane, Queensland, Australia, is located at the transformed Brisbane World Expo '88 site, South Bank Parklands. It is one of the most significant heritage items in Brisbane from the hosting of the Expo. It is the only international exhibit remaining on the site.

Origins
In 1986, the United Nations International Year of Peace, the Kingdom of Nepal agreed to participate in World Expo '88, and the Association to Preserve Asian Culture was commissioned to create, operate for the Expo, and find a new home for the Pagoda at the Expo's conclusion.

Construction
The Peace Pagoda was built by German architect  (APAC) on behalf of the Kingdom of Nepal. Immediately,  of indigenous Nepalese timber were sourced from the Terai jungle forest of Nepal, carted across to the capital Kathmandu where 160 Nepalese families worked for two years at crafting its diverse elements. These were then shipped to Australia in two  containers and one  container, where they were assembled at the Expo site by a handful of Australian workers under Nepalese supervision and architect Jochen Reier. The final assembly for World Expo 88 Expo 88 Brisbane took 6 month.

During the Expo
Three-levelled, with a beautiful tea house on the second level, and one of the only hand-crafted pavilions, the Pagoda quickly became one of the most visited and photographed pavilions at the Expo. Towards the end of the Expo, a group of persons called Friends of the Pagoda established a petition to keep the Pagoda in Brisbane after the conclusion of the Expo, with some 70,000 signatories, which the architect and chairman of APAC, Jochen Reier had collected during Expo.

Sir Edmund Hillary, the first person to ascend Mount Everest, was VIP guest to the Pagoda during the Expo on 8 August 1988.

Artistic and religious heritage
The Pagoda is one of only three Nepal Peace Pagodas outside of Nepal, all build by the German architect J. Reier, who had the dream, to bring Peace Pagodas to all five Continents. The other two being in Munich and Osaka, and are identical of Pashupatinath Temple in Kathmandu, with significant Hindu and Buddhist iconography representing the different Avatars of Shiva, Buddhas in different states of meditation, or madras, the eight auspicious symbols of Buddhism, a sacred statue of Avalokiteshvara, the Buddhist deity of compassion, as well as a Peace Bell, two smaller side Pavilions, a Buddhist stupa, and a Peace Post, with the calling to World Peace in four languages Japanese, French, Spanish and English. Sanskrit prayer chants also feature inscribed on the roof eaves of the two side Pavilions, as well as the inscription for om above the central door.

Whilst not used as a traditional Buddhist or Hindu center, it is occasionally used for weddings, private functions, book launches and company events, and many visitors can be seen using the Pagoda's internal first level Church pews for personal meditation. South Bank Corporation manages the Pagoda on behalf of the Roma Street Parkland and the City of Brisbane.

After the Expo
After the Expo, it was work of Friends of the Pagoda, with Brisbane City Council Councilor David Hinchliffe as head, to liaise between government and private donations to keep the Pagoda in Brisbane, and the campaign was a success, largely also due to the last minute concluding successful donation by retirees Mr. & Mrs. Frank & Myra Pitt. Various ideas were put forward as to where to host the Pagoda, including the Queensland Art Gallery, and City Botanic Gardens, with South Bank Parklands the final successful resting place for the Pagoda, at its new riverfront location, where it became part of the parklands opening in June 1992.

2008 20th Anniversary of World Expo '88
As part of the 20th Anniversary celebrations of World Expo '88, Foundation Expo '88 and the newly re-launched The Friends of the Pagoda Association hosted a retrospective World Expo '88 photograph exhibition and memorabilia display at the Pagoda, of which the memorabilia display still is shown to this day. The Queensland Branch of the Nepal Australia Friendship Association (NAFA) also held Nepal-themed poster, pamphlet and craftwork displays at the Pagoda on the World Expo '88 20th Anniversary Community Day, Saturday 10 May 2008.

Gallery

References

External links

Tourist attractions in Brisbane
History of Brisbane
World's fair architecture in Brisbane
Pagodas in Australia
1988 establishments in Australia
Buildings and structures completed in 1988
Buildings and structures in Brisbane
Newa architecture
Wooden buildings and structures in Australia
South Brisbane, Queensland
Queensland Heritage Register
World Expo 88